Renato Acanfora (born 23 July 1957 in Scafati) is a retired professional Italian football player.

External links

1957 births
Living people
Italian footballers
Serie A players
Inter Milan players
Calcio Lecco 1912 players
A.C. Monza players
A.C. Prato players
Taranto F.C. 1927 players
A.S.D. Martina Calcio 1947 players
Vastese Calcio 1902 players
People from Scafati
Association football midfielders
Footballers from Campania
Sportspeople from the Province of Salerno